Gabriel Geraldo dos Santos Araújo (born 16 March 2002) is a Brazilian paralympic swimmer.

References

External links
 

Living people
2002 births
Swimmers at the 2020 Summer Paralympics
Medalists at the 2020 Summer Paralympics
Paralympic gold medalists for Brazil
Paralympic silver medalists for Brazil
Paralympic swimmers of Brazil
Paralympic medalists in swimming
Brazilian male freestyle swimmers
S2-classified Paralympic swimmers
Brazilian male backstroke swimmers
Medalists at the World Para Swimming Championships
21st-century Brazilian people